Michael Wilson is a British TV presenter.
Wilson was Business Editor for Sky News and could be seen at the London Stock Exchange talking to various people about the big news in business as well as looking at stock markets across the World. He became a Freeman of the City of London in 2005 and was voted Broadcast Business Journalist in the same year. Michael is television's longest serving business editor.

He began his television career at Thames Television in 1979, and became one of the station's leading current affairs reporters and presenters, and in 1987 founded Thames' flagship show, The City Programme. In the 1990s he also presented London News Radio's Breakfast Show and helped launch Reuters Financial Television.

Wilson joined Sky News in 1989 and was part of the Sky News team for the 1992 UK general election, the first general election covered by Sky News. Wilson left towards the end of 1992, to become a presenter on GMTV,
 where he presented the first weekday programme with Fiona Armstrong.  However, their partnership did not last long as ratings dipped. Fiona left and Wilson founded the 6-7am GMTV News Hour, with Eamonn Holmes and Lorraine Kelly taking up the Monday to Friday roles as main GMTV presenters, with Anne Davies as newsreader and relief presenter.  The News Hour broke television early morning viewing records by achieving one million viewers in less than six months.

Wilson left in 1995 to return to Sky News and stayed with for 14 years as Business Editor and launched Sky Business Report, the news channel's daily evening money programme until he left at the end of May 2009.

Since leaving Sky News, he has returned to GMTV, where he has been given a reporting role as a business analyst. Michael has also regulalrly appeared on Arise news as a business analyst. He is also broadcasting on other platforms, chairing international conferences and has been commissioned to write a book about the post-recession world.

References

External links
 Michael Wilsons Biography
 Michael Wilson official website

British television presenters
Sky News newsreaders and journalists
GMTV presenters and reporters
People from Scarborough, North Yorkshire
Living people
Year of birth missing (living people)
British business and financial journalists
People educated at Scarborough High School for Boys